Donald Dee Shinnick (May 15, 1935 – January 20, 2004) was an American football player and coach. He played professionally as a linebacker for 13 seasons in the National Football League (NFL) for the Baltimore Colts. He had 37 career interceptions with the Colts, still an NFL record for a linebacker. Shinnick played college football as a quarterback at University of California, Los Angeles (UCLA)

After retiring as a player, he served as an assistant coach with the Chicago Bears, the St. Louis Cardinals, the Oakland Raiders and the New England Patriots. He was also the head football coach at Central Methodist University in Fayette, Missouri from 1979 to 1981.

Shinnick died at a rest home in Modesto, California on January 20, 2004, of frontal lobe disorder.

Head coaching record

References

External links
 
 

1935 births
2004 deaths
American football linebackers
American football quarterbacks
Baltimore Colts players
Central Methodist Eagles football coaches
Chicago Bears coaches
Los Angeles Valley Monarchs football players
New England Patriots coaches
Oakland Raiders coaches
St. Louis Cardinals (football) coaches
UCLA Bruins football players
Coaches of American football from Missouri
Sportspeople from Kansas City, Missouri
Players of American football from Kansas City, Missouri
Neurological disease deaths in California